Members Only is a brand of clothing that became popular in the 1980s with its line of jackets. The brand was created in 1975 and introduced to American markets in 1980 by Europe Craft Imports. Members Only racer jackets were distinguished by their narrow epaulettes and collar strap and their knitted trim; they were manufactured in a wide variety of colors. Their advertising tagline was "when you put it on, something happens".

In the 2010s, Members Only continued to launch seasonal collections carried at online retailers as well as brick-and-mortar stores such as Urban Outfitters.

Revival
The brand was licensed in 2016 by Sammy Catton, President of iApparel Brands, LLC. Ron Malhotra currently owns the brand. In recent years, Members Only has added many styles of jackets, including a women's line, Footwear, Sportswear, and Hosiery.

In popular culture
Communication scholar Todd Kelshaw has interpreted the brand's popularity surge as part of a broader American ideological shift in the early 1980s from participatory communities to materially-based communities represented in the purchase of consumer products. Members Only were known in the 1980s for their shift from celebrity endorsements as a form of advertisement to public service announcements regarding issues like anti-drugs and pro-voting. La Cosa Nostra members were known for wearing this type of jacket in the 1980s and 1990s.

The brand is often used as a source of comedy and an example of outdated fashion. In the film Shallow Hal, Mauricio (Jason Alexander) is insulted by Rosemary (Gwyneth Paltrow), who points out his Members Only jacket and says, "I guess you must be the last member."

Political journalist Matt Bai, in his book All The Truth Is Out: The Week Politics Went Tabloid, about former U.S. Senator Gary Hart's ill-fated 1988 presidential campaign, said that he had once referred to Hart as a dated figure from the 1980s, "the political version of a Members Only jacket."

Sheryl Crow mentions the brand in her song "Members Only" from her 1998 album, The Globe Sessions.

On the tv series Will & Grace, Karen Walker's maid Rosario Salazar frequently wore her Member's Only jacket over her uniform.

On an episode of "Beavis and Butthead" that includes a critique of Black Sabbath's "Iron Man" video, Butthead asks, "Which one's Ozzy?" Beavis promptly responds, "that's him in the Members Only jacket."

In The TV show The Sopranos, the first episode of season 6 titled "Members Only", Eugene Pontecorvo is wearing a jacket of the type. In the series finale, the main character Tony Soprano is believed to have been shot by a man wearing a similar jacket.

In the movie Zoolander, Hansel says, "Ten minutes. Old Members Only warehouse. You oughta remember that. You're a dinosaur. Let's go" after being challenged to a walk-off by Derek.

In the Netflix series Night Stalker, serial killer Richard Ramirez is described by witnesses and survivors as wearing a black Members Only jacket.

In the TV show The Venture Bros, Hank Venture's band "Shallow Gravy" sings their only song, Jacket. Listed among the long lines of jackets is a Members Only jacket.

In the TV show Friday Night Lights, Matt Saracen wears a Members Only Jacket on his first date with Julie Taylor.

References

External links
 

Clothing brands of the United States
Manufacturing companies based in New York City
American companies established in 1975
Clothing companies established in 1975
1975 establishments in New York (state)
1980s fashion